Johnstown is a rural locality split between the South Burnett Region and the Gympie Region, both in Queensland, Australia. In the  Johnstown had a population of 30 people.

History 
The locality name is derived from a pastoral run held in 1854 by John Stephen Ferriter. The run is shown on an 1872 map of Southern Queensland, south of the Stephenton run which was also held by Ferriter, suggesting the names of the runs derive from Ferriter's given names.

Johnstown Provisional School opened on 27 March 1916 and closed on 1 September 1924. It reopened on 18 April 1933 and closed on 20 February 1935.

Johnstown West Provisional School opened on 4 July 1938. On 22 October 1952 it became Johnstown West State School. It closed on 7 July 1967.

In the  Johnstown had a population of 30 people.

Geography
Lake Barambah forms part of the western boundary.

Road infrastructure
The Burnett Highway runs through the western extremity.

References 

South Burnett Region
Gympie Region
Localities in Queensland